Eocarterus amicorum is a species of ground beetle in the genus Eocarterus. It belongs to the subgenus Baeticum. E. amicorum has a very limited geographical range, being present in only Spain.

References

A
Beetles described in 1993